The 2010 Vaahteraliiga season was the 31st season of the highest level of American football in Finland. The regular season took place between May 21 and August 22, 2010. The Finnish champion was determined in the playoffs and at the championship game Vaahteramalja XXXI the Porvoo Butchers won the Seinäjoki Crocodiles.

Standings

Playoffs

References

American football in Finland
Vaahteraliiga
Vaahteraliiga